GEMS Girls' Clubs is a non-denominational, non-profit, Christian organization that seeks to equip women and girls to live radically faithful lives for Christ. Clubs are established in churches and other Christian organizations and allow women to mentor girls as they develop a living, dynamic relationship with Jesus. GEMS, which stands for "Girls Everywhere Meeting the Savior", was founded in 1958 in Grand Rapids, Michigan, by Barbara Vredevoogd and has since grown to become an international ministry with 5,200 women serving over 23,000 girls in more than 800 clubs in the United States, Canada, Zambia, Kenya, Spain, Australia, New Zealand, Uganda, China, South Africa, Zimbabwe, and The Bahamas.

History
In 1957, the Young Calvinist Federation decided there was a mounting need to design a ministry specifically for young girls. Barb Vredevoogd, a member of Beverly Christian Reformed Church in Wyoming, Michigan, was invited to expand the club program she had designed for local girls, in order to offer the curriculum to other churches as well. Vredevoogd then became the first acting director, and the program – originally known as Calvinettes – began to flourish.

In 1966, GEMS (formerly "Calvinettes"), the Calvinist Cadet Corps, and ThereforeGo (then the Young Calvinist Federation) merged to form Dynamic Youth Ministries (then known as United Calvinist Youth).

In 2006, GEMS expanded its global vision to reach girls everywhere by organizing clubs in Africa. Since then, girls in clubs across North America have been active in assisting the efforts. New curriculum has been developed, a micro-financing program has started, and construction has started the Esther School for orphans and under-resourced children in Zambia.

GEMS Girls' Clubs is governed by an executive board that oversees general policies, finances, and the overall effectiveness of the ministry.

Program levels
Most local churches divide their GEMS programs into three age levels. GEMS produces a variety of age-appropriate curriculum for each level. GEMS also partners with Cadets to produce a curriculum for 4- and 5-year-olds, and offers a leadership-development position for high school-aged girls who wish to remain in the program. 

 Kingdom Kids (4 & 5 year olds)
 Awareness Level (grades 1-3)
 Discovery Level (grades 4-6)
 Advanced Level (grades 7-8)
 Counselor-in-Training/CIT (grades 9-12)

Magazines
GEMS Girls' Clubs produces two magazines that help girls recognize and embrace their potential to be world changers.

SHINE brightly
Published monthly from September through May, SHINE brightly is for girls ages nine to fourteen. Each issue contains three Bible lessons as well as articles and stories that inspire girls to be activists for Christ. The magazine is designed to help girls see how God is at work in their lives and in the world around them.

Sparkle
Produced monthly from October through March, Sparkle is designed for girls in grades 1-3. Through Bible lessons, articles, stories, and games, it seeks to show girls how they can make a difference in the world.

Leadership training
A crucial aspect of the GEMS ministry is giving women the tools they need to effectively reach out to the girls in their local clubs. Volunteer leaders (counselors) are offered training opportunities in which they learn how to use the GEMS curricula as well as gain important insights into the development stages of the age group they are teaching. These training events are all designed to equip and encourage counselors in their work with girls.

Each summer, GEMS hosts its Annual Counselors' Leadership Conference for women. This is a major event for the ministry and is held in different locations around North America. Volunteer leaders are also appointed to various areas of the United States and Canada, and these women offer training and support to the counselors in their geographic region.

Accountability
GEMS Girls' Clubs is a member of the Evangelical Council for Financial Accountability. Members of the ECFA must adhere to standards of responsible stewardship including high standards of accountability in fundraising, financial disclosure, confidentiality of donor information, and the use of resources. The ministry submits to an annual independent audit.

References

External links
 GEMS Girls' Clubs
 ThereforeGo Ministries
 Cadets
 CSB Ministries

Christian non-aligned Scouting organizations
1958 establishments in Michigan
Christian organizations established in 1958
Christian organizations based in the United States